Záhorovice is a municipality and village in Uherské Hradiště District in the Zlín Region of the Czech Republic. It has about 1,000 inhabitants.

Geography
It lies on the border between the Vizovice Highlands and White Carpathians. The river Olšava flows through the municipality.

References

Villages in Uherské Hradiště District